Brinsop is a small hamlet 6 miles north-west of Hereford, England: it has a uniquely well-preserved medieval church. The civil parish is called Brinsop and Wormsley.  At the 2011 census it had a population of 131.

Church description
A small, but historic church set in characteristically wooded Herefordshire dell.  Unfortunately most of the redsand stonework has been looted, still the original carved tympanum (similar to Kilpeck) dates from circa 1150–60 depicts St George on horseback, a knight crusader slaying a serpent-dragon, since before the construction of Brinsop Court.  Typical of the Herefordshire much of its motifs are of fabulous creatures, some mythical.  It borrowed heavily from Normandy for influences, probably Parthenay-le-Vieux, Poitou.  But the voussoirs is similar to that at Shobdon within a sequence of zodiacal beasts.

There are two coffin lids in the church with foliated crosses.  The early 14th century church of St George's has a single nave and chancel with an arcade of two bays and double-chamfered arches have a date of c1320, and two bays were added c. 1333–40.  The north aisle was probably built after 1300 with Dec windows which have been isolated to date 1330–40, the church's original foundation was probably older.  There are south facing windows with Y-tracery.

Medieval wall paintings of 1300 of the south wall showing the Feast of the Annunciation, the Visitation of the Angel Gabriel, and the Crucifixion of Christ are from early fourteenth century.  The stoup is 15th century.  The local medieval gentry were the Dansey family celebrated in the church; a tablet of William Dansey (d.1708) survives by Edward Stanton with large Corinthian pilasters and two putti.  On the west wall is an even earlier stone inscription to William Dansey, 1628.  More recent archaeological work has established that a medieval rampart existed to the south-east beyond the moat where a small pond was dug in 1969.

The bells were even more fascinating with unusual Latin markings dedicating to Saints Michael, John and Margaret. The church was restored by architect William Chick in 1866–67 in which the south porch and west bell tower were added.  The roofs were also repaired.  To the west of the house he altered a former school; which was housed in the Glebe House instead. South-western corner of the nave were done by Clayton & Bell in 1881, and the previous decade aisle improvements were completed.  They included 14th c stained glass in the tracery.

20th-century improvement
In the 1920s Sir Ninian Comper improved the interior of the church by adding an alabaster reredos to separate nave from chancel adorned with the gilded angel figures of St George and St Martin.  The chancel was restored in 1929, after the east window stained glass was finished in 1923, as too was a north transept chapel repair.  A war memorial was also erected in 1920 but inside the chapel.  In the graveyard Comper built a tomb in 1925 for Herbert Astley, the court's proprietor.

Notes

References 

Bibliography

External links
Brinsop Church
Brinsop Church2
Brinsop Church3

Hamlets in Herefordshire
Churches in Herefordshire
Anglo-Norman families